Mikhail Alexievich Koulakov (8 January 1933 – 15 February 2015) was a Russian abstract painter.

Life 
Born in Moscow on 8 January 1933, Koulakov majored in stage design, studying with the painter and director Nikolai Akimov, at the Institute of Theatre Arts in Leningrad. He worked as a graphic designer for the publishing company Lenizdat, illustrating the work of his friends, the poets V. Sosnora, G. Gorbovsky, S. Davydov, and the short stories and tales of Alexander Grin among others. Koulakov worked for theatres in Volchov, Leningrad and Moscow. Koulakov resided in Italy from 1976 until his death in 2015 and worked in his studio in San Vito (Narni), Umbria. In 1993 he was elected a senior academician of the Fine Arts Academy “Pietro Vannucci”, Perugia.

Koulakov died on 15 February 2015, aged 82.

Art 

Koulakov was a representative of the Soviet avant-garde of the 1960s and one of the founders of the "Second Abstraction" in Russia; he graduated in set design under Nikolai Akimov, an artist and the director, at the Leningrad's Institute for Theatrical Arts in 1962, and started his career in Moscow and Leningrad where his works were displayed in alternative spaces to the prevailing socialist realism.

Martial arts 

Koulakov was a Tai Chi Chuan 7th Dan master. In 1990 he published the book Tai Chi Chuan, il Grande Limite.

Exhibitions 
Anthological exhibitions
His anthological exhibitions include: 
1988: Auditorium of San Domenico (Narni)
1989: The Soviet Union Foundation of Culture, ex-riding school of the Czars in Leningrad and Riga Arsenal
1991: Architectural complex “San Michele a Ripa” in Rome
1993: Pushkin State Museum of Fine Arts, Moscow, State Ethnographic Museum, St. Petersburg, and Palazzo Ruspoli in Rome
1996: “Bibliomediateca” (Terni)
2003: CERP “Centro Espositivo Rocca Paolina” (Perugia)

Collective exhibitions
Some of the collective exhibitions he has taken part: 
1977: “Salon d'Art Sacre” in Paris
1977: “X Quadriennale” in Rome
1977: Venice Biennial “La nuova arte sovietica. Una prospettiva non ufficiale”
1979: “20 Jahre unabhaengiger Kunst aus der Sovjetunion”, Museum Bochum, Bochumkunstsammlung, Bochum
1994: “IV Biennale di Arte Sacra”, San Gabriele, Teramo
1995: “From Gulag to glasnost” Norton and Nancy Dodge Collection, Jane Vorhees Zimmerli Art Museum, Rutgers, USA
1996: “Non konformisty-Seconda avanguardia russa”, Collezione Bar-Ger: The Russian State Museum, St. Petersburg - State Tretjakov Gallery, Moscow - Staedel Kunstinstitut, Frankfurt am Main - Kunsthaus, Leverkusen
1997: Josef Albers Museum, Quadrat Bottrop; “Arte Metro Roma” project, mosaic at Anagnina Metro Station, Rome 
1998: “Anatomia Sovremennogo iskusstva” St. Petersburg
1999: “Die Suche nach der Freiheit. Moskauer Kuenstler der 50er und 70er Jahre”, Berlin-Hamburg; “Un colore in più”, Spazio Krizia, Milan
2000: “Un angelo per la città”, Rocca Paolina, Perugia 
2001: “Abstrakzia v Rossii”, Russian State Museum, St. Petersburg
2003: “Moskovskaja abstrakzia, 2. polovina XX veka”, State Tretjakov Gallery, Moscow.

Personal Exhibitions

 1964: House of Culture, Akademgorodok Novosibirsk
 1966: Theatre of Satire, Moscow 	 	 
 1967: Institute of Physics, Moscow
 1968: Institute of Physics, Erevan
 1968: Institute of Physics and Chemics, Moscow	 
 1969: House of Scientists Dubna, Moscow	 
 1975: Libreria Internazionale Paesi Nuovi, Roma
 1977: Galleria Trifalco, Roma
 1977: International Institute, Minneapolis
 1977: Banach Gallery, New York 	 	 
 1978: Galleria Trifalco, Roma 	 
 1979: Galerie Slavia, Bremen
 1980: Galleria Cecchini, Perugia
 1980: Cooperatriva Esperienze Culturali, Bari
 1980: Galleria San Carlo, Napoli
 1981: Galerie Basilisk, Wien 	 	 
 1984: Galleria Cortina, Milano 	 	 
 1985: Palazzo dei Priori, Perugia 	 	 
 1986: Galerie Schrepfer, München 	 	 
 1988: Galleria Trifalco, Roma
 1988: Auditorium San Domenico, Narni 	 	 
 1989: Galerie Art East Art West, Hamburg
 1989: Mugnano di Perugia
 1989: Gallery of Soviet Culture Fund, Moscow	 	 
 1990: Arsenal, Riga
 1990: Manege, Leningrad
 1990: Savitski Gallery, Pensa
 1990: Galleria La Gradiva, Roma
 1990: Galleria Il Bucchero, Ortebello 	 	 
 1991: Galleria Forzani, Terni
 1991: Dostojevski Museum, Leningrad
 1991: Yurjevski Monastery, Novgorod
 1991: S. Michele a Ripa, Roma 	 	 
 1992: G. Braun Medienhaus, Karlsruhe
 1992: Galerie Art Modern International, Aachen
 1992: Galerie Kunst in der Scheune, Offenbach
 1992: Castello Trecentesco, Celano 	 	 
 1993: Pushkin Museum, Moscow
 1993: Palazzo Ruspoli, Roma
 1993: Russian Ethnographic Museum, St. Petersburg
 1993: Palazzo Petrignani, Amelia
 1993: Galerie Weber, Berlin 	 	 
 1996: Bibliomediateca, Terni 	 	 
 1999: Spazio Arte, Perugia
 1999: Banca d'Italia, Roma 	 	 
 2003: "Celare il cielo", Galleria Giulia, Roma
 2003: "Genesi", Rocca Paolina, Perugia
 2003: "Radici e Globalizzazione. Omaggio a Mikhail Koulakov", Palazzo Santoro Colella, Pratola Peligna 	 	 
 2005: "Verso l'autunno", l'Indicatore, Roma  	 	 
 2007: "Put geroia", Galereia Albom, Sankt Peterburg
 2007: "Besoblachnoe vremia - Tempo senza nubi", Fond Era, Moskva 	 	 
 2008: "Il Sole, la Luna, l'Universo", Circolo Culturale l'Officina, Perugia
 2008: Galleria Arte Contemporanea Sante Moretto, Vicenza
 2008: "Potop mlechnyh putei. Diluvio delle vie lattee", State Tretyakov Gallery, Moskva
 2008: "Fiori celesti", Palazzo Venezia, Roma 	 	 
 2011: "Signs of Spirituality", Galleria Nazionale di Arte Moderna GNAM, Roma
 2011: H.C. Andersen Museum, Rome
 2013: "80 anni tra Russia e Italia", Centro Russo di Scienze e Cultura, Roma
 2015: "Mikhail Koulakov: Umbria seconda patria", Palazzo Vecchio, Sangemini
 2016: "Mikhail Koulakov: Il Cosmo nel Gesto", Palazzo di Primavera, Terni
 2019: "Mikhail Kulakov. The Style of the Thaw Period", MMOMA Moscow Museum of Modern Art, Moscow

References 

 "Mikhail Koulakov. La spiritualità del segno" By Matilde Amaturo
 Mikhail Koulakov. La spiritualità del segno, opere dal 1960 al 2010, Ministero dei Beni Culturali 
 Mikhail Koulakov - 80 anni tra Russia e Italia, Artitribune
 80 anni tra Russia e Italia, undo.net
 A Roma è la volta di Koulakov, Russia Oggi, La Repubblica
 Dalla Russia opere per San Valentino, Corriere della Sera
 Mikhail Koulakov: Fiori Celesti, MP News
 THE FLOOD OF MILKY WAYS, The State Tretyakov Gallery
 L’Art non officiel soviétique de l’U.R.S.S. à l’Occident de 1956 à 1986. Deux parcours : Oskar Rabine et la revue A-Ya, Mathilde CHAMBARD
 METRO’ DI ROMA: i quattro pannelli musivi del capolinea “Anagnina”
 La Russia, l’astrazione e l’Italia. L’omaggio di Mosca a Mikhail Kulakov
 В Москве открылась масштабная выставка Михаила Кулакова

External links
Official website
Il magico informale di Mikhail Koulakov

20th-century Russian painters
Russian male painters
21st-century Russian painters
Soviet Nonconformist Art
1933 births
Artists from Moscow
2015 deaths
20th-century Russian male artists
21st-century Russian male artists